Acrolophus dorsimacula is a moth of the family Acrolophidae. It was described by Harrison Gray Dyar Jr. in 1900. It is found in North America.

References

Moths described in 1900
dorsimacula